Ireti Heebah Kingibe (born 2 June 1954) is a Nigerian civil engineer and politician. She was elected member of the senate representing the FCT in the 2023 Nigerian elections under the Labour party. She is a younger sister of Ajoke Mohammed the wife of former Nigerian head of state Murtala Mohammed.

Early life & Education 
Kingibe's education started at Emotan preparatory school, after which she attended Queen's College Lagos and Washington Irving High school for her secondary school education. She bagged a degree in Civil engineering from the University of Minnesota.

Career 
Kingibe started her Career as a Quality Control Engineer with Bradley Precast Concrete Inc. from 1978 to 1979. She then moved on to work with the Minnesota Department of Transportation Design unit, where she also worked as an engineer from 1979 and 1991. She returned to Nigeria for her one-year mandatory service year between 1981 and 1982. She was posted to work as a project Supervisor with the Nigerian Air Force base in Ikeja, Lagos. 

In 1982 she got to work with the New Nigeria Construction Company, Kaduna as a planning engineer. In 1985, she left New Nigeria Construction Company to work as a consultant for Belsam Limited.

Ireti then became the regional engineer for Lodigiani Nigeria Limited Lagos between 1990 and 1994.

She currently works as a senior Partner with Kelnic Associates, Abuja.

Politics 
Kingibe's political career began in 1990 with her appointment as Adviser to the National Chairman of the defunct Social Democratic Party (SDP). 

In 2003 she was the FCT senatorial candidate for the All Nigeria People's party. She defected to the People's Democratic Party in 2006. However, in 2014 she joined the All Progressive Congress (APC), because she could not handle the politics in PDP.  In 2015 she ran for the senatorial seat under APC, but she later withdrew

Kingibe Joined Labour Party in 2022 and became their FCT Senatorial candidate for the 2023 Nigerian elections and won the elections. Before the elections, she pledged her basic salary (if she should win) to a special fund to tackle infrastructural deficits in the rural communities within the nation's capital.

Controversy 
On Tuesday, 28 February 2023, The Independent National Electoral Commission (INEC) declared Ireti Kingibe the winner of the Federal Capital Territory as announced by the returning officer Sanni Saka; the agent of other political parties did not agree to the authenticity of the results and decided not to sign the result sheet. Kingibe held a press conference arguing that INEC had no basis for canceling an election she won and defeated the three-term Senator Philip Aduda. At the press conference, she claimed that opposition parties bribed electoral officers during the presidential and National assembly elections. She also claimed that there was an alleged move to rig her out of the election and that the Gwarinpa collation Centre was attacked by thugs who destroyed the result sheets.

References 

University of Minnesota alumni

1954 births
Living people